An advance payment, or simply an advance, is the part of a contractually due sum that is paid or received in advance for goods or services, while the balance included in the invoice will only follow the delivery. Advance payments are recorded as a prepaid expense in accrual accounting for the entity issuing the advance. Advanced payments are recorded as assets on the balance sheet. As these assets are used they are expended and recorded on the income statement for the period in which they are incurred. Insurance is a common prepaid asset, which will only be a prepaid asset because it is a proactive measure to protect business from unforeseen events.

See also
Advance against royalties
Chicago Options Associates
Pay or play contract
Prepaid expense
Signing bonus

External links
Dictionary of Small Business definition: "advance payment"
UC Advance Payment

Expense
Asset